Cranfield is a village in Bedfordshire, England. It may also refer to:

Education
 Cranfield University, British postgraduate university
 Cranfield School of Management, business school of Cranfield University

Places
 Cranfield Airport, formerly RAF Cranfield, airfield outside Cranfield, England
 Cranfield Court, demolished country house in Cranfield, Bedfordshire, England
 Cranfield Icefalls, series of icefalls in Oates Land, Antarctica
 Cranfield Peak, peak in the Queen Elizabeth Range, Antarctica
 Cranfield Point, southernmost point of Northern Ireland

People
 Arthur Cranfield (1892–1957), British newspaper editor 
 Beaumont Cranfield (1872–1909), English cricketer
 Charles Cranfield (1915–2015), British theologian, academic, and minister
 Edward Cranfield (fl. 1680–1696), English colonial administrator 
 Harry Cranfield (1917–1990), English footballer
 John Cranfield, Saint Helena politician
 Lionel Cranfield (disambiguation), multiple people
 Monty Cranfield (1909–1993), English cricketer

Other
 Cranfield experiments, computer information retrieval experiments
 Cranfield United F.C., English football club